Secret police (or political police) are intelligence, security or police agencies that engage in covert operations against a government's political, religious, or social opponents and dissidents. Secret police organizations are characteristic of authoritarian and totalitarian regimes. They protect the political power of a dictator or regime and often operate outside the law to repress dissidents and weaken political opposition, frequently using violence.

History

Africa

Uganda 
In Uganda, the State Research Bureau (SRB) was a secret police organisation for President Idi Amin. The Bureau tortured many Ugandans, operating on behalf of a regime responsible for more than five hundred thousand violent deaths. The SRB attempted to infiltrate every area of Ugandan life.

Asia

China 
In East Asia, the jinyiwei (Embroidered Uniform Guard) of the Ming Dynasty was founded in the 1360s by the Hongwu Emperor and served as the dynasty's secret police until the collapse of Ming rule in 1644. Originally, their main functions were to serve as the emperor's bodyguard and to spy on his subjects and report any plots of rebellion or regicide directly to the emperor. Over time, the organization took on law enforcement and judicial functions and grew to be immensely powerful, with the power to overrule ordinary judicial rulings and to investigate, interrogate, and punish anyone, including members of the imperial family. In 1420, a second secret police organization run by eunuchs, known as the dongchang (Eastern Depot), was formed to suppress suspected political opposition to the usurpation of the throne by the Yongle Emperor. Combined, these two organizations made the Ming Dynasty one of the world's first police states.

After the 2019-20 protests in Hong Kong (a special administrative region of China), the Hong Kong Police Force is sometimes referred to as the "secret police" by protesters.

Japan 
In Japan, the Kenpeitai existed from 1881 to 1945, and were described as secret police by the Australian War Memorial. It had an equivalent branch in the Imperial Japanese Navy known as the Tokkeitai. However, their civilian counterpart known as the Tokkō was formed in 1911. Its task consisted of controlling political groups and ideologies in Imperial Japan, resembling closer the other secret police agencies of the time period. For this it earned the nickname "the Thought Police".

South Korea 
The Korean Central Intelligence Agency or KCIA was a secret police agency which acted extra-judiciously, and was involved in such activities as kidnapping a presidential candidate and the Assassination of Park Chung-hee, among other things.

Taiwan 
In Taiwan, the Taiwan Garrison Command acted as a secret police/national security body which existed as a branch of the Republic of China Armed Forces. The agency was established at the end of World War II, and operated throughout the Cold War. It was disbanded on 1 August 1992. It was responsible for suppressing activities viewed as promoting democracy and Taiwan independence.

Europe 

Secret police organizations originated in 18th-century Europe after the French Revolution and the Congress of Vienna. Such operations were established in an effort to detect any possible conspiracies or revolutionary subversion. The peak of secret-police operations in most of Europe was 1815 to 1860, "when restrictions on voting, assembly, association, unions and the press were so severe in most European countries that opposition groups were forced into conspiratorial activities." The Geheime Staatspolizei of Austria and the Geheimpolizei of Prussia were particularly notorious during this period. After 1860, the use of secret police declined due to increasing liberalization, except in autocratic regimes such as Tsarist Russia.

Germany 
In Nazi Germany from 1933 to 1945, the Geheime Staatspolizei (Secret State Police, Gestapo) were a secret police organization used to identify and eliminate opposition, including suspected organized resistance. Its claimed main duty, according to a 1936 law, was "to investigate and suppress all anti-State tendencies". One method used to spy on citizens was to intercept letters or telephone calls. They encouraged ordinary Germans to inform on each other. As part of the Reich Security Main Office, it was also a key organizer of the Holocaust. Although the Gestapo had a relatively small number of personnel (32,000 in 1944), "it maximized these small resources through informants and a large number of denunciations from the local population". After the defeat of the Nazis in World War II, the East German secret police, the Stasi, likewise made use of an extensive network of civilian informers.

Hungary 
The House of Terror museum in Budapest displays the headquarters for the Arrow Cross Party, which killed hundreds of Jews in its basement, among other targets considered "enemies of the race-based state". The same building was used by the State Protection Authority (or ÁVH) secret police. The Soviet-aligned ÁVH moved into the former fascist police headquarters and used it to torture and execute state opponents.

Russia 

Ivan the Terrible implemented Oprichnina in Russia between 1565 and 1572. In the Russian Empire, the secret police forces were the Third Section of the Imperial Chancery and then the Okhrana. Agents of the Okhrana were vital in identifying and suppressing opponents of the Tsar. The Okhrana engaged in torture and infiltration of opponents. They infiltrated labor unions, political parties, and newspapers. After the Russian Revolution, the Soviet Union established the Cheka, OGPU, NKVD, NKGB, and MVD. Cheka, as an authorized secret police force under the rule of the Bolsheviks, suppressed political opponents during the Red Terror. It also enacted counterintelligence operations such as Operation Trust, in which it set up a fake anti-Bolshevik organization to identify opponents. It was the temporary forerunner to the KGB, a later secret police agency used for similar purposes. The NKVD participated in the Great Purge under Stalin.

North America

Cuba 
In Cuba, President Fulgencio Batista's secret police, known as the Bureau for the Repression of Communist Activities (or BRAC), suppressed political opponents such as the 26th of July Movement through methods including violent interrogations.

Under the Communist Party of Cuba, the Ministry of the Interior has served a number of secret policing functions. As recently as 1999, the Human Rights Watch reported that repression of dissidents was routine, albeit harsher after heightened periods of opposition activity. The Bureau of Democracy, Human Rights, and Labor under the US State Department reported that Cuba's Ministry of the Interior utilizes a network of informants known as the Committees for the Defense of the Revolution (or CDR) to monitor government opponents. Secret state police have operated in secret among CDR groups, and most adult Cubans are officially members. CDR are tasked with informing on other Cubans and monitoring activity in their neighborhoods.

Mexico
During the Truman doctrine, Mexican president Miguel Alemán Valdés created DFS to combat communist opposition. The agency was later replaced by DISEN in 1985 after DFS agents were working for the Guadalajara Cartel. In 1989, it was replaced by CISEN.

United States 

In Mississippi, the Mississippi State Sovereignty Commission (or "Sov-Com") was a state agency given unusual authority by the governor of Mississippi from 1956 to 1977, to investigate and police private citizens in order to uphold racial segregation. This authority was used to suppress and spy on the activities of civil rights workers, along with others suspected of sentiments contrary to white supremacy. Agents from the Sov-Com wiretapped and bugged citizens of Mississippi, and historians identify the agency as a secret police force. Among other things, the Sov-Com collaborated with the Ku Klux Klan and engaged in jury tampering to harass targets. The agency ceased to function in 1973, but was not officially dissolved until 1977.

In private writings in 1945, President Harry S. Truman wrote that the Federal Bureau of Investigation (under Director J. Edgar Hoover) had transformed into a secret police force, and compared it to the Gestapo:We want no Gestapo or Secret Police.  F.B.I. is tending in that direction.  They are dabbling in sex life scandles [sic] and plain blackmail when they should be catching criminals.  They also have a habit of sneering at local law enforcement officers.Beginning a decade later in 1956, Hoover's FBI began the COINTELPRO project, aimed at suppressing domestic political opponents. Among other targets, this included Martin Luther King Jr.

South America

Brazil 
During the Getúlio Vargas dictatorship, between 1930 and 1946, the Department of Political and Social Order (DOPS) was the government's secret police.

During the military dictatorship in Brazil, DOPS was employed by the military regime along with the Department of Information Operations - Center for Internal Defense Operations (or DOI-CODI) and the National Intelligence Service (or SNI), and engaged in kidnappings, torture, and attacks against theaters and bookstores.

Chile 
The National Intelligence Directorate, or DINA, was a powerful secret police agency under the rule of Augusto Pinochet, which was charged with killings and torture related to repression of political opponents. Chilean government investigations found that over 30,000 people were tortured by the agency.

Venezuela 
During the dictatorship of Marcos Pérez Jiménez, the Seguridad Nacional secret police investigated, arrested, tortured, and assassinated political opponents to the Venezuelan government. The Seguridad Nacional was abolished following the overthrow of Pérez Jiménez on 23 January 1958.

During the crisis in Venezuela and Venezuelan protests, Vice Presidents Tareck El Aissami and Delcy Rodríguez have been accused of using SEBIN to oppress political demonstrations. SEBIN director and general Manuel Cristopher Figuera reported that SEBIN would torture political demonstrators during interrogation sessions.

Functions and methods
Ilan Berman and J. Michael Waller describe the secret police as central to totalitarian regimes and "an indispensable device for the consolidation of power, neutralization of the opposition, and construction of a single-party state". In addition to these activities, secret police may also be responsible for tasks not related to suppressing internal dissent, such as gathering foreign intelligence, engaging in counterintelligence, organizing border security, and guarding government buildings and officials. Secret police forces sometimes endure even after the fall of a totalitarian regime.

Arbitrary detention, abduction and forced disappearance, torture, and assassination are all tools wielded by secret police "to prevent, investigate, or punish (real or imagined) opposition." Because secret police typically act with great discretionary powers "to decide what is a crime" and are a tool used to target political opponents, they operate outside the rule of law.

People apprehended by the secret police are often arbitrarily arrested and detained without due process. While in detention, arrestees may be tortured or subjected to inhumane treatment. Suspects may not receive a public trial, and instead may be convicted in a kangaroo court-style show trial, or by a secret tribunal. Secret police known to have used these approaches in history included the secret police of East Germany (the Ministry for State Security or Stasi) and Portuguese PIDE.

Control

A single secret service may pose a potential threat to the central political authority. Political scientist Sheena Chestnut Greitens writes that: "When it comes to their security forces, autocrats face a fundamental 'coercing dilemma' between empowerment and control. ... Autocrats must empower their security forces with enough coercing capacity to enforce internal order and conduct external defense. Equally important to their survival, however, they must control that capacity, to ensure it is not turned against them." Authoritarian regimes therefore attempt to engage in "coup-proofing" (designing institutions to minimize risks of a coup). Two methods of doing so are:

 increasing fragmentation (i.e., dividing powers among the regime security apparatuses to prevent "any single agency from amassing enough political power to carry out a coup") and
 increasing exclusivity (i.e., purging the regime security apparatus to favor familial, social, ethnic, religious, and tribal groups perceived as more loyal).

See also

 Chekism
 Committee of Public Safety
 Counterintelligence state
 Death squad
 Extrajudicial punishment
 Gestapo
 High policing
 List of historical secret police organizations
 List of secret police organizations
 Mass surveillance
 McCarthyism
 NKVD
 Police state
 Thought Police
 Secret Service

References

External links
 High Policing: The Protection of National Security

 
Authoritarianism
Law enforcement
Law enforcement units
National security
Political repression
Secrecy
Totalitarianism